Bradford Banta (born December 14, 1970) is a former American football tight end and long snapper in the National Football League (NFL).

College career
Banta was a two-year starter at tight end for USC Trojans (1989–93), as well as a four-time letter-winner. He earned Honorable Mention All-Pac-10 Conference honors as a junior and senior and received his bachelor's degree in communications with a minor in sociology in 1993.

Professional career
Banta was drafted in the 4th round of the 1994 NFL Draft, 106 overall, by the Indianapolis Colts. He then went on and played from 1994 to 2004 for the Indianapolis Colts, the New York Jets, the Detroit Lions, and the Buffalo Bills. He is noted for committing two unnecessary roughness penalties on a Monday Night Football matchup against the Miami Dolphins in 2000.

Banta served as a long snapper for a majority of his career, and played exclusively on special teams with the Lions. He had previously played tight end in offensive situations for the Colts.

After his playing days, Banta worked with as a supervisor for George Wright Construction for a year and in Chase’s Home Financial Division for nearly two years in Chattanooga, Tennessee.

Coaching career

University of Tennessee at Chattanooga
Banta coached the tight ends during the Chattanooga Mocs' 2007 season.

Detroit Lions
Banta was the assistant special teams coach for the Detroit Lions from 2008 to 2011, and then the assistant linebackers coach for the 2012 and 2013 seasons.

Washington Redskins
On February 4, 2014, it was announced that Banta would join the team as the Washington Redskins assistant special teams coach, serving under Ben Kotwica.

New Orleans Saints
On January 31, 2017, the New Orleans Saints hired Banta as their Special teams coordinator.

External links
 Washington Redskins bio
 

1970 births
Living people
Players of American football from Baton Rouge, Louisiana
American football tight ends
American football long snappers
Louisiana State University Laboratory School alumni
USC Trojans football players
Indianapolis Colts players
New York Jets players
Buffalo Bills players
Detroit Lions players
Coaches of American football from Louisiana
Detroit Lions coaches
Washington Redskins coaches
Chattanooga Mocs football coaches